Samantha McGlone (born July 19, 1979 in St. Catharines, Ontario) is a Canadian triathlete.

McGlone competed at the second Olympic triathlon at the 2004 Summer Olympics.  She took twenty-seventh place with a total time of 2:10:14.24. McGlone won the Canadian National Triathlon championship in both 2004 and 2005.

On November 11, 2006, McGlone won the Ironman 70.3 World Championship with a time of 4:12:58, and qualified for the full Ironman World Championship 2007 in Kona, Hawaii. On October 13, 2007, she came in second place at the Kona Ironman with a time of 9:14:04.

References

1979 births
Living people
Canadian female triathletes
Triathletes at the 2004 Summer Olympics
Olympic triathletes of Canada
Sportspeople from St. Catharines
21st-century Canadian women